The Women's 25 km competition at the 2022 World Aquatics Championships was held in June 2022.

Results
The race was started at 07:00.

References

Women's 25 km
Women's 25 km open water